The Saint Kitts and Nevis national football team is the national team of Saint Kitts and Nevis and is controlled by the St. Kitts and Nevis Football Association. They are affiliated to the Caribbean Football Union of CONCACAF.

They are nicknamed The Sugar Boyz due to the sugar cultivation on the island of St. Kitts.

History

Beginnings (1938–1990) 
Saint Kitts and Nevis played their first match on 18 August 1938, against Grenada, a match that ended in a 2–4 defeat. They participated in the Leeward Islands Tournament from 1949 however had to wait until 1979 to play their first official matches, in the qualifying rounds for the 1979 CFU Championship, losing twice to Jamaica, both results finishing 2–1. They would again fail to qualify for the final phase of the 1983 CFU Championship, after advancing due to Jamaica's withdrawal, they'd be eliminated by Martinique, who won 12–0 on aggregate.

1990–2000 
The Sugar Boyz qualified for their first tournament at the 1993 Caribbean Cup, defeating Dominican Republic (3–2) and British Virgin Islands (5–0) to top their qualifying group. In the tournament proper, they finished second behind Jamaica to reach the semi-finals, before losing to Martinique on penalties. In the match for third place, they were defeated 3–2 by Trinidad and Tobago. Saint Kitts and Nevis finished bottom of their group in 1996 but in the 1997 Caribbean Cup, they advanced into the knock-out after finishing level on points with both Trinidad and Tobago and Martinique, then defeated Grenada 2–1 in extra-time with both goals scored by Keith Gumbs, but they succumbed to Trinidad and Tobago 0–4 in the final. Since they'd reached the final, Saint Kitts and Nevis were entered into a play-off against Cuba – runner-up in the 1996 Caribbean Cup – for the last ticket to the 1998 CONCACAF Gold Cup, but they lost 2–0.

Saint Kitts and Nevis participated for the first time in the 1998 FIFA World Cup qualifiers. After benefiting from the withdrawal of the Bahamas, they beat Saint Lucia 5–1 in Basseterre and 1–0 in Castries, but fell in the third knockout round against Saint Vincent and the Grenadines, losing thanks to the away goals rule.

2000s
In the 2002 World Cup qualifiers, after comfortably beating the Turks and Caicos Islands with an aggregate result of 14–0, Saint Vincent and the Grenadines once again dispatched the Sugar Boyz, winning both in Kingstown (1–0) as in Basseterre (1–2). However, the situation would improve in the 2006 qualifiers, since Saint Kitts and Nevis advanced to the second group phase after leaving the US Virgin Islands and Barbados on the way. They shared Group 3 with Mexico, Trinidad and Tobago and Saint Vincent and the Grenadines, but as expected, finished in last place, with 6 losses in as many appearances. They also experienced the worst defeat in their history, 8–0 against Mexico. In the preliminary round for the 2010 qualifiers, they were unable to repeat what they had done four years ago and were unceremoniously eliminated by Belize, who won 4–2 on aggregate.

In the Caribbean Cup, the Sugar Boyz did not repeat the successes of the '90s and could only qualify to the final phase of the 2001 Caribbean Cup, although they did not advance beyond the group phase. They have not returned to a final phase since that edition.

2010–present
Qualifying directly to the second round of the 2014 qualifiers, Saint Kitts and Nevis was drawn in Group D along with Canada, Puerto Rico and Saint Lucia. They finished in 3rd place, with 7 points. It was only defeated by Canada in Toronto (4–0). In the 2018 World Cup qualifiers, Saint Kitts and Nevis defeated the Turks and Caicos Islands in the first round by a lofty aggregate 12–4 before falling in the second phase, at the hands of El Salvador, 6–3 on aggregate, but not before obtaining a 2–2 draw at home. In November 2015, they played 2 friendlies against European teams, Andorra (1–0) and Estonia (0–3). Devaughn Elliott scored the only goal in the victory over Andorra, becoming the first St. Kitts and Nevis player to score against a European side. The result was also the first away victory for a CFU team over a European side on their home soil.

In October 2016, it reached its highest ranking in the FIFA world ranking (73rd place) thanks to its good performance in the 2nd round of the 2017 Caribbean Cup of Nations qualifiers. However, two defeats against French Guiana (0-1) and Haiti at home (0-2 a.e.t.) stopped the Sugar Boyz in the 3rd round of these qualifiers. The year ends with a 1–1 draw in Basseterre against Estonia on November 19, 2016, in a friendly match, one year after playing against the same team in Tallinn.

In June 2017, the team went on a second European tour and played Armenia on June 4 in Yerevan and Georgia three days later in Tbilisi. Both games ended in equally bad losses, 5-0 and 3–0, respectively. St. Kitts and Nevis continues its pattern of international tours and travels in August 2017 to Mumbai to meet Mauritius and India in a friendly tournament, the 2017 Hero Tri-Nation Series. Both matches ended in draws acquired by the same score of one goal each.

The Sugar Boyz will meet Andorra again on March 25, 2022, six and a half years after their only confrontation, for a friendly match in Andorra la Vella. This time the Principality's selection wins against Saint Kitts and Nevis on its home stadium (1-0).

Fixtures and results

The following is a list of match results in the last 12 months, as well as any future matches that have been scheduled.

2022

2023

Coaches

 Carlos Cavagnaro (1988)
 Alistair Edwards (1996–97)
 Ces Podd (1999–00)
 Clinton Percival (2000–01)
 Elvis Browne (2002–04)
 Lenny Lake (2004)
 Leonard Taylor (2008)
 Lester Morris (2008)
 Lenny Lake (2008–10)
 Clinton Percival (2010–12)
 Jeffrey Hazel (2012–15)
 Jacques Passy (2015–19)
 Earl Jones (2019)
 Claudio Caimi (2019–21)
 Leonardo Neiva (2021)
 Austin Huggins (2022–)

Players

Current squad
 The following players were called up for the 2022–23 CONCACAF Nations League matches.
 Match dates: 9 and 13 June 2022.
 Opposition:  and 
 Caps and goals correct as of:' 25 March 2022, after the match against 

Recent call ups

Player recordsPlayers in bold are still active with Saint Kitts & Nevis.''

Competitive record

FIFA World Cup

CONCACAF Gold Cup

CONCACAF Nations League

Caribbean Cup

National football stadium

References

External links 
Official Website

 
Caribbean national association football teams